The 2022 T1 League draft was the second edition of the T1 League's annual draft. It was held on July 12, 2022. There were six teams joined the draft, including the Kaohsiung Aquas, the New Taipei CTBC DEA, the Taichung Wagor Suns, the Tainan TSG GhostHawks, the TaiwanBeer HeroBears and the Taoyuan Leopards. There were 44 players participated in the draft, and 14 players were chosen in 3 rounds.

Draft results 

 Reference：

Trade involving draft picks

Draft combine 
The draft combine was held at Taipei Gymnasium on July 9, 2022. There were 36 players participated in the draft combine.

Entrants 
On July 6, 2022, the T1 League released its official list of entrants, consisting of 44 players from college and other educational institutions in this edition of the draft.

  Pai Yao-Cheng, G
  Chiang Shang-Chien, G
  Wu Tsung-Hsien, F
  Lu Tsai Yu-Lun, F
  Lee Ming-Xiu, G
  Lee Wei-Ting, G
  Lee Chi, F
  Shen Jui-Yang, F/C
  Ku Mao Wei-Chia, G
  Lin Tzu-Wei, G
  Lin Yi-Chung, F
  Lin Tung-Ying, G
  Lin Che-Ting, G
  Lin Yu-Kai, G
  Chiu Tzu-Hsuan, G/F
  Chiu Chia-Hao, G/F
  Kao Cheng-En, G
  Chang Shih-Wei, G/F
  Tsao Xun-Xiang, G
  Chuang Chia-Cheng, F
  Chuang Po-Chiang, G
  Lien Wei-Sheng, G
  Kuo Han, F/C
  Chen Hsiao-Jung, G
  Chen Hung-Che, G
  Chen Ting-Yu, F/C
  Chen Pin-Chuan, G
  Chen Kuei-En, G
  Chen Chien-Ming, G
  Chen Yu-An, F
  Chen Chia-Hsun, G
  Chang Fu-Yi, F
  Huang Hung-Yu, G
  Huang Jian-Zhi, F
  Huang Hsuan-Min, G
  Tung Yung-Chuan, F
  Tsai Ya-Hsuan, G
  Chiang Hao-Wei, G
  Cheng Cheng-Yao, G
  Cheng Yu-Chun, G
  Lai Chun-Ting, G/F
  Chien Li-Chieh, G
  Han Chieh-Yu, F/C
  Lan Chun-Yi, F

Note

References 

T1 League draft
Draft
2022 in Taiwanese sport
T1